The 2015 UEFA Super Cup was a football match between Spanish teams Barcelona and Sevilla on 11 August 2015 at the Boris Paichadze Dinamo Arena in Tbilisi, Georgia. It was the 40th UEFA Super Cup, an annual tournament contested by the winners of the UEFA Champions League and UEFA Europa League. Barcelona were appearing in the Super Cup for the ninth time, they had previously won and lost the competition four times each. Sevilla were appearing in the competition for the fourth time, they had won once and lost twice. The two sides had met before in the competition in 2006, when Sevilla won 3–0.

The teams had qualified for the competition by winning the two seasonal European competitions. Barcelona won the 2014–15 UEFA Champions League, defeating Italian Juventus 3–1 in the final. Sevilla qualified as winners of the 2014–15 UEFA Europa League. They beat Ukrainian team Dnipro 3–2 in the final.

Barcelona won the game 5–4 after extra time to claim their fifth Super Cup title, tying Milan's record. Their ninth Super Cup appearance was also a record, two ahead of Milan. Dani Alves's fourth Super Cup win and fifth appearance matched Paolo Maldini's records, while Luis Enrique became the fourth man to lift the UEFA Super Cup as coach and player after Pep Guardiola, Carlo Ancelotti and Diego Simeone. The nine goals scored was also the most in any Super Cup fixture, and the attendance of 51,940 was a record for a one-off, neutral venue UEFA Super Cup.

Venue

The Mikheil Meskhi Stadium was originally announced as the venue of the Super Cup at the UEFA Executive Committee meeting on 5 March 2014, but the venue was changed to the Boris Paichadze Dinamo Arena. This was the first UEFA Super Cup hosted in Georgia. The Boris Paichadze Dinamo Arena was built in 1976 and renovated in 2011. It is the home stadium of the Georgia national football team and FC Dinamo Tbilisi.

Teams

Match

Summary

Sevilla took the lead in the third minute through a curling free kick from Éver Banega, awarded for a foul on José Antonio Reyes by Javier Mascherano. Barcelona equalised in a similar manner four minutes later, when Lionel Messi scored from a free kick following Grzegorz Krychowiak's foul on Luis Suárez, and then took the lead through another Messi free kick in the 16th minute, after Banega fouled former Sevilla midfielder Ivan Rakitić. Suárez had a goal ruled out for offside shortly after, but Rafinha made the score 3–1 to Barcelona at half time, sliding in from close range after Suárez's effort was saved by Beto.

Suárez scored early in the second half, assisted by a pass from Sergio Busquets after the midfielder intercepted a pass in the Sevilla half, but Reyes pulled a goal back for Sevilla five minutes later, following a cross from Vitolo. In the 72nd minute, Vitolo was brought down in the Barcelona penalty area by Jérémy Mathieu, and Kevin Gameiro powered home the resulting penalty kick to make the score 4–3. With 10 minutes to play, two Sevilla substitutes combined for the equalising goal, as Ciro Immobile squared the ball across the goal area for Yevhen Konoplyanka to score. Messi almost had a hat-trick of free kicks in the 89th minute, but his attempt hit the crossbar.

Barcelona introduced Pedro in place of Mascherano at the start of the additional half-hour. With five minutes to play in the second half of extra time, he pounced on the rebound from yet another Messi free kick to put Barcelona ahead, just as he had against Shakhtar Donetsk in 2009. Adil Rami had an attempt on goal from the edge of the goal area in injury time at the end of the extra period, but he missed and Barcelona won the Super Cup for a record fifth time. With nine goals shared between the two teams, this was the highest scoring Super Cup.

Details

Statistics

Broadcasters
The match was shown on beIN Sports in Spain.

See also
2006 UEFA Super Cup – contested between same teams
Sevilla FC in European football
FC Barcelona in international football competitions
Spanish football clubs in international competitions

References

External links

2015 UEFA Super Cup, UEFA.com

2015
Super Cup
UEFA
Sports competitions in Tbilisi
International club association football competitions hosted by Georgia (country)
2015–16 in Spanish football
FC Barcelona matches
Sevilla FC matches
August 2015 sports events in Europe
2010s in Tbilisi